Saphir was one of six s built for the French Navy in the first decade of the 20th century.

Design and description
The Émeraude class were built as part of the French Navy's 1903 building program to a Maugas single-hull design. The submarines displaced  surfaced and  submerged. Their crew numbered 2 officers and 23 enlisted men.

For surface running, the boats were powered by two Sautter-Harlé  diesel engines, each driving one propeller shaft. When submerged each propeller was driven by a 300-metric-horsepower electric motor.

The boats were armed with four internal  torpedo tubes, two in the bow and two in the stern, for which they carried six torpedoes.

Construction and career
Saphir was laid down in October 1903 at the Arsenal de Toulon, launched on 6 February 1909 and commissioned on 10 December 1910. Upon her completion, Saphir was assigned to the Mediterranean. In 1913, she joined a squadron based in Bizerte, French Tunisia, to defend the region. In late 1914, she moved to a base at Tenedos so as to be closer to the Dardanelles and to participate in monitoring and blockading of Turkish Straits.

On 13 December 1914, a British submarine, entered the straits and sank the Ottoman Navy central battery ironclad Messudiyeh. On 15 January 1915, to follow the example of B11 and without prior orders, the commanding officer of Saphir, Lieutenant Henri Fournier, tried to force the entrance of the straits. As Saphir dived under a minefield off Çanakkale, she sprang a leak. The flooding forced Saphir to surface under fire from Ottoman guns, and Fournier gave the order to destroy Saphir′s code documents and scuttle the submarine 1,500 meters (1,640 yards) from the coast. The crew tried to gain ground by swimming. Thirteen of 27 enlisted men and the two officers did not survive the swim to shore, perishing from the cold; the 14 survivors were recovered by two Ottoman Army boats and transferred, after interrogation, to prisons, including the one in Afyonkarahisar. Some soon after were transferred to prisoner-of-war camps in Asia Minor, where they managed to escape.

Citation

A French citation read:

Citations

Bibliography

Émeraude-class submarine (1906)
World War I submarines of France
1908 ships
Maritime incidents in 1915
Scuttled vessels
World War I shipwrecks in the Dardanelles